Bangladesh National Film Award for Best Supporting Actor is the highest award for actors in a supporting role in Bangladesh.

List of winners
Key

Records and statistics

Multiple wins
The following individuals received two or more Best Male Playback Singer awards:

See also
 Bangladesh National Film Award for Best Supporting Actress
 Bangladesh National Film Award for Best Actor
 Bangladesh National Film Award for Best Actress

Notes

References

Sources

 
 
 
 
 
 
 

Supporting Actor
National Film Awards (Bangladesh)